Tayloe may refer to:

People in the United States
William Tayloe (the immigrant), High Sheriff of York County, Virginia
William Tayloe (the nephew), of Richmond and Lancaster Counties, Virginia
John Tayloe I (1688–1747), plantation owner and businessman in Virginia
John Tayloe II (1721–1779), plantation owner and horse breeder in Virginia
John Tayloe III (1770-1828), military officer, Virginia state senator, and horse breeder
Benjamin Ogle Tayloe (1796–1868), American businessman, horse breeder, planter, and diplomat in Washington, D.C.
William Henry Tayloe ( 1799–1871) American businessman, horse breeder, planter and land speculator
Henry Augustine Tayloe (1808-1903) American businessman, horse breeder, planter, and land speculator
George Plater Tayloe (1804-1897), American businessman, planter, land speculator, and founder of Hollins University
Edward Thornton Tayloe (1803–1876), American diplomat and planter
John Tayloe Lomax (1781–1862), American jurist
Nellie Tayloe Ross (1876–1977), American politician, 14th Governor of Wyoming, and director of the United States Mint
W. Tayloe Murphy Jr. (born 1933), Virginia lawyer and politician

Historic houses
Benjamin Ogle Tayloe House, Washington, D.C., built in 1828 by Benjamin Ogle Tayloe
Tayloe House (Williamsburg, Virginia), purchased by John Tayloe II

See also
Willard v. Tayloe, an 1869 U.S. Supreme Court decision